Year 141 (CXLI) was a common year starting on Saturday (link will display the full calendar) of the Julian calendar. At the time, it was known as the Year of the Consulship of Severus and Stloga (or, less frequently, year 894 Ab urbe condita). The denomination 141 for this year has been used since the early medieval period, when the Anno Domini calendar era became the prevalent method in Europe for naming years.

Events 
 By place 
 Roman Empire 
 The Temple of Antoninus and Faustina is constructed in Rome; the temple is dedicated to Empress Faustina the Elder.

 Asia 
 Last (6th) year of Yonghe era of the Chinese Han Dynasty.
The 141 Lycia earthquake affects most of the Roman provinces of Lycia and Caria and the islands of Rhodes, Kos, Simi and Serifos. It triggers a severe tsunami, which causes major inundation.

 By topic 
 Religion 
 Change of Patriarch of Constantinople from Felix of Byzantium to Polycarpus II of Byzantium.

 Arts and Science 
 6th recorded perihelion passage of Halley's Comet.

Births 
 Cheng Yu, Chinese politician and court advisor (d. 220)
 Ummidia Cornificia Faustina, Roman noblewoman (d. 182)

Deaths 
 Faustina the Elder, Roman empress (b. c. AD 100)
 Philo of Byblos, Phoenician historical writer (b. AD 64)

References